Edoardo Blondett (born 7 January 1992) is an Italian footballer who plays as a defender for  club Cerignola.

Career
Born in Genoa, Liguria, Blondett started his professional career at U.C. Sampdoria. He played for Giovanissimi U15 team in 2006–07 season to the reserve team from 2009 to 2011. On 26 July 2011 Blondett left for Valenzana in temporary deal.

In summer 2012 goes on loan, from Sampdoria, to Portogruaro Calcio.

On 17 August 2013, Blondett was signed by Cosenza, initially in temporary deal. On 10 July 2014 he joined the Serie C club outright, in 3-year deal.

On 2 September 2019, he signed a 2-year contract with Reggina.

On 21 September 2020, he joined Alessandria on a 2-year contract. On 1 February 2021, he was loaned to Livorno.

On 30 August 2021, he signed a two-year deal with Fermana.

On 16 September 2022, Blondett moved to Cerignola.

References

External links
 Football.it Profile 
 

1992 births
Living people
Footballers from Genoa
Italian footballers
Association football defenders
Serie C players
Lega Pro Seconda Divisione players
U.C. Sampdoria players
Valenzana Mado players
A.S.D. Portogruaro players
Cosenza Calcio players
U.S. Livorno 1915 players
Catania S.S.D. players
Casertana F.C. players
Reggina 1914 players
U.S. Alessandria Calcio 1912 players
Fermana F.C. players
S.S.D. Audace Cerignola players
Italy youth international footballers